The 2010 Final Resolution was a professional wrestling pay-per-view (PPV) event produced by the Total Nonstop Action Wrestling (TNA) professional wrestling promotion, that took place on December 5, 2010 at the Impact Zone in Orlando, Florida. It was the seventh event under the Final Resolution chronology.

In October 2017, with the launch of the Global Wrestling Network, the event became available to stream on demand.

Storylines

Final Resolution featured nine professional wrestling matches that involved different wrestlers from pre-existing scripted feuds and storylines. Wrestlers portrayed villains, heroes, or less distinguishable characters in the scripted events that built tension and culminated in a wrestling match or series of matches.

Results

References

External links
Final Resolution website
TNA Official website

Final Resolution
2010 in professional wrestling in Florida
Professional wrestling shows in Orlando, Florida
December 2010 events in the United States
2010 Total Nonstop Action Wrestling pay-per-view events